Guido Calabresi (born October 18, 1932) is an Italian-born American scholar of law and Senior circuit judge of the United States Court of Appeals for the Second Circuit. He is a former Dean of Yale Law School, where he has been a professor since 1959. Calabresi is considered, along with Ronald Coase and Richard Posner, a founder of the field of law and economics.

Early life and education
Calabresi is the son of the late cardiologist Massimo Calabresi and European literature scholar Bianca Maria Finzi-Contini Calabresi (1902–1982). Calabresi's parents, active in the resistance against Italian fascism, eventually fled Milan for New Haven, Connecticut, immigrating to the United States in September 1939. The family became naturalized American citizens in 1948. Guido's older brother Paul Calabresi (1930–2003) was a prominent medical and pharmacological researcher of cancer and oncology. Calabresi's mother descends from an Italian-Jewish family. He describes himself as a "practicing Catholic" who believes in God.

Calabresi received his Bachelor of Science degree summa cum laude from Yale College in 1953, majoring in economics — a choice which would have significant connections with his later pursuits. He was then selected as a Rhodes Scholar, studying at Magdalen College, Oxford, which awarded him a Bachelor of Arts degree with First Class Honors in 1955. This was later promoted by seniority to a Master of Arts in 1959. He received his Bachelor of Laws (LL.B.) magna cum laude from Yale Law School in 1958, graduating first in his class, and was also a law review member as Note Editor of the Yale Law Journal from 1957 to 1958. Following graduation from Yale Law, Calabresi served as a law clerk for United States Supreme Court Associate Justice Hugo Black from 1958 to 1959. Additionally, he is a member of Phi Beta Kappa and the Order of the Coif.

Legal career 
Calabresi had been offered a full professorship at the University of Chicago Law School in 1960. However, he joined the faculty of the Yale Law School upon completion of his Supreme Court clerkship, becoming the youngest ever full professor at Yale Law, and was Dean from 1985 to 1994. He now is Sterling Professor Emeritus of Law and Professorial Lecturer in Law at Yale.

Calabresi is a member of the Connecticut Bar Association and from 1971 to 1975 served as town selectman for Woodbridge, Connecticut.

Calabresi is, along with Ronald Coase, a founder of law and economics. His pioneering contributions to the field include the application of economic reasoning to tort law, and a legal interpretation of the Coase theorem. Under Calabresi's intellectual and administrative leadership, Yale Law School became a leading center for legal scholarship imbued with economics and other social sciences. Calabresi has been awarded more than forty honorary degrees from universities across the world. He is a member of the Royal Swedish Academy of Sciences.

Federal judicial service 
On February 9, 1994, President Bill Clinton nominated Calabresi as a United States Circuit Judge of the United States Court of Appeals for the Second Circuit vacated by Judge Thomas Joseph Meskill. He was confirmed by the United States Senate on July 18, 1994. He received his commission on July 21, 1994 and entered duty on September 16, 1994. Calabresi assumed senior status on July 21, 2009.

President Clinton is a 1973 graduate of the Yale Law School, although he never had Calabresi as a professor. Among Calabresi's group of former students are Supreme Court Justices Samuel Alito, Clarence Thomas and Sonia Sotomayor, former United States Attorney General Michael Mukasey, feminist legal scholar and law professor at the Universities of Michigan and Chicago Catharine MacKinnon, former White House Counsel Gregory Craig, legal scholar Philip Bobbitt, Senator John Danforth, Harvard Law School professor Richard H. Fallon Jr., civil and human rights legal scholar Kenji Yoshino, torts scholar and law professor at the University of Virginia Kenneth Abraham, feminist international attorney Ann Olivarius, and New York University School of Law torts professor Catherine Sharkey. Calabresi, alone among Yale Law School faculty members, supported Thomas's nomination to the Supreme Court.

Awards and honors  
In 1985, he was awarded the Laetare Medal by the University of Notre Dame, the oldest and most prestigious award for American Catholics.

Yale, in 2006, created the Guido Calabresi Professorship of Law, with Kenji Yoshino serving as the inaugural professor of the endowed chair. Daniel Markovits is the current holder of the chair.

Calabresi is an Honorary Editor of the University of Bologna Law Review, a general student-edited law journal published by the Department of Legal Studies of the University of Bologna.

Calabresi is the author of four books and over 100 articles on law and related subjects.

Honors
 Elected to the American Academy of Arts and Sciences, 1972
Honorary degree, University of Pavia, 1987
Elected to the American Philosophical Society, 1997
 Honoris causa degree in Law, University of Brescia, 21 January 2013 
 Robert B. McKay Law Professor Award, American Bar Association Tort Trial and Insurance Practice Section, 2015

Major works 
 1961, "Some Thoughts on Risk Distribution and the Law of Torts," Yale Law Journal.
 1970. The Costs of Accidents: A Legal and Economic Analysis. Yale University Press.
 1972 (with Douglas Melamed), "Property Rules, Liability Rules and Inalienability: One View of the Cathedral," Harvard Law Review. (Very often cited.)
 1982 "A Common Law For The Age of Statutes," (Harvard University Press).
 1978  (with Philip Bobbit)"Tragic Choices. The conflicts society confronts in the allocation of tragically scarce resources." (WW Norton and Company New York, NY)

Notable decisions 
 Leibovitz v. Paramount Pictures Corp., 137 F.3d 109 (2nd Cir. 1998).
 Arar v. Ashcroft (2nd Cir. 2009), dissenting.
 United States v. Calvin Weaver, 18-1697 (2nd Cir. 2021). In a case regarding an unwarranted police search of a Black man walking by, Calabresi was one of three dissenters who argued that the search violated the 4th amendment. The other two dissenters were Rosemary Pooler and Denny Chin. Calabresi explained that "The majority begins its opinion by saying that this is an ordinary case of an ordinary police search.  That,  unfortunately,  is  all  too  true.  But  though  ordinary,  and very common, the facts of this case, and the fact that a strong majority made up of thoughtful judges comes out as it does, demonstrates beyond peradventure why this area of the law is so disastrous."
 Mujo v. Jani-King International, Inc., 20-111 (2nd Cir. 2021). Calabresi dissented from a ruling that permitted a corporation to require employees to sign a contract giving the corporation power to take part of their salary despite Connecticut's minimum wage laws.

Personal life
Calabresi married Anne Gordon Audubon Tyler, a social anthropologist, freelance writer, social activist, philanthropist and arts patron. Both received their primary education at the Foote School in New Haven, graduating in 1946 and 1948, respectively. Calabresi would continue on to receive his secondary education from Hopkins School, graduating in 1949. They reside in Woodbridge, Connecticut, and have three children. Anne Gordon Audubon Calabresi (Anne Calabresi Oldshue), a psychiatrist, graduated cum laude from Yale, attended medical school at Case Western Reserve University and completed residency at Harvard. Massimo Franklin Tyler ("M.F.T.") Calabresi, a journalist with Time magazine, also graduated from Yale. Bianca Finzi-Contini Calabresi attended Yale as well, graduating summa cum laude, and has a Ph.D. in Renaissance literature from Columbia. Calabresi's nephew, Steven G. Calabresi, is a Constitutional Law professor at Northwestern University and a co-founder of the Federalist Society.

Calabresi and his wife own an olive grove in Florence, Italy, where they produce olive oil each year. He is a fan of Inter Milan and the New York Yankees.

See also 
 List of Jewish American jurists
 List of law clerks of the Supreme Court of the United States (Seat 1)

References

External links 
  

 Calabresi's profile at Yale Law School.

 

1932 births
20th-century American non-fiction writers
21st-century American non-fiction writers
Alumni of Magdalen College, Oxford
American people of Italian descent
American people of Lombard descent
American legal scholars
American legal writers
American people of Italian-Jewish descent
American male non-fiction writers
American Rhodes Scholars
Connecticut Democrats
Connecticut lawyers
Deans of Yale Law School
Italian emigrants to the United States
Judges of the United States Court of Appeals for the Second Circuit
Laetare Medal recipients
Law and economics scholars
Law clerks of the Supreme Court of the United States
Living people
Members of the Royal Swedish Academy of Sciences
People who emigrated to escape Nazism
Lawyers from New Haven, Connecticut
People from Woodbridge, Connecticut
United States court of appeals judges appointed by Bill Clinton
Yale Law School alumni
Yale Law School faculty
Yale Sterling Professors
Yale College alumni
20th-century American judges
21st-century American judges
20th-century American male writers
21st-century American male writers
Members of the American Philosophical Society
Corresponding Fellows of the British Academy